"Badass Moms in the Zombie Apocalypse" is a 2020 science fiction/horror short story by Rae Carson, about childbirth and the zombie apocalypse. It was first published in Uncanny.

Synopsis
Because zombies are attracted to blood and screaming, Brit must leave her compound and give birth to her child in a "birthing enclosure" — a shipping container.

Reception
"Badass Moms in the Zombie Apocalypse" was a finalist for the Nebula Award for Best Short Story in 2020, and for the 2021 Hugo Award for Best Short Story.

Strange Horizons called it "hugely satisfying".

References

External links
Text of the story, at Uncanny

2020 short stories
Science fiction short stories
Works originally published in online magazines